Nikolay Yuryevich Martsenko (born 25 May 1993) is a racing car driver from Russia.

Career

Early career
Born in Krasnoyarsk, Martsenko started his racing career at the age of eleven in amateur Russian touring car championships. Since sixteen he participated in various Formula Three championships including German Formula Three Championship, Finnish Formula Three Championship and North European Zone Formula 3 Cup.

Formula Three
His German Formula Three campaign started in 2009 with four races in Trophy Classes at Oschersleben for Jenichen Motorsport. For the next season Martsenko graduate into Cup Class with  Max Travin Racing Team, for which he raced in Finnish Formula Three Championship and North European Zone Formula 3 Cup. In 2011 he stayed in series in the same team, amassing nine points with the best result — finish on fourth place at Assen.

Formula Renault 3.5 Series
For 2012 Max Travin Racing Team planned to enter the championship with Martsenko as one of drivers. But the team was rejected from final entry list. After this Max Travin Racing and Martsenko joined forces with BVM Target for his debut in the series.

Racing record

Career summary

Complete Formula Renault 3.5 Series results
(key) (Races in bold indicate pole position) (Races in italics indicate fastest lap)

Complete GP3 Series results
(key) (Races in bold indicate pole position) (Races in italics indicate fastest lap)

References

External links
 
 

1993 births
Living people
Sportspeople from Krasnoyarsk
Russian racing drivers
German Formula Three Championship drivers
World Series Formula V8 3.5 drivers
Russian GP3 Series drivers
BVM Target drivers
Pons Racing drivers
Comtec Racing drivers
Hilmer Motorsport drivers